The Heikes Covered Bridge is a historic covered bridge in Huntington Township, Adams County, Pennsylvania. The bridge crosses Bermudian Creek. It is one of 17 covered bridges in Adams, Cumberland, and Perry Counties.

It was added to the National Register of Historic Places in 1980.

References

Covered bridges in Adams County, Pennsylvania
Covered bridges on the National Register of Historic Places in Pennsylvania
Bridges completed in 1892
Bridges in Adams County, Pennsylvania
National Register of Historic Places in Adams County, Pennsylvania
Road bridges on the National Register of Historic Places in Pennsylvania
Wooden bridges in Pennsylvania
Burr Truss bridges in the United States